Eugene William Shue (December 18, 1931 – April 3, 2022) was an American professional basketball player and coach in the National Basketball Association (NBA). Shue was one of the top guards of the early days of the NBA and an influential figure in the development of basketball. He is credited with having invented the "spin move" while being an early harbinger of other plays and strategies.

Shue was an NBA All-Star five consecutive times (1958–62). After his successful playing career, he became a long-serving coach, twice winning NBA Coach of the Year. Throughout his career as player, coach, and executive, Shue was "a specialist at taking over faltering teams".

Early life
Shue was born in Baltimore on December 18, 1931.  He grew up in the city's Govans neighborhood and attended Towson Catholic High School. His family lived on welfare and he did not own a basketball as a child. He grew up a fan of the Baltimore Bullets and Buddy Jeannette, recollecting in 1994:

Playing career

College
As a prospect in 1950, Shue was lightly recruited by University of Maryland's newly hired coach Bud Millikan. However, he wanted to play for the more-established programs at Loyola or Georgetown. After getting turned down by Loyola and getting wait listed by Georgetown after two underwhelming tryouts, Shue opted to instead play for Maryland. Shue did not receive a scholarship and instead worked odd jobs, including cleaning the basketball court (only receiving a scholarship his senior season). Joining a program with Coach Millikan that had losing records in eight of its last 10 seasons, Shue later remarked:

In his tenure with Maryland, Shue and Millikan led the school's team to new heights, including their first 20-plus win regular season (23 his senior year), their first appearance in national rankings (peaked at #13 in 1954), and entrance into the Atlantic Coast Conference. While at Maryland, Shue joined Delta Kappa Epsilon fraternity.

Shue left Maryland as its star player and their first high-profile NBA prospect. He broke all of the school scoring records and made the All-ACC team.

Professional 
Following his collegiate graduation, Shue was drafted third overall in the 1954 NBA draft by the Philadelphia Warriors. After just six games with the Warriors Shue was sold to the New York Knicks, after notifying then-owner Eddie Gottlieb that his paycheck was $10 short ($110.15 in 2022).

After the 1955–56 season, Shue was traded to the Fort Wayne Pistons for Ron Sobie. In 1956–57 season he played his first full season for the Pistons.

The franchise moved to Detroit the following season. Shue recalled the struggles during the opening game at the Detroit Olympia: "There were so many delays during the game because the floor was slippery from the ice below it, a problem that often happened. I didn’t like playing there because it was a large building with small crowds and you were always freezing your butt off."

In Detroit, Shue blossomed as a player and became popular enough for the P.A. to develop the catchphrase "Two for Shue". He started a streak of five All-Star Game appearances and five playoff berths.

In 1959–60 season he recorded 22.8 pts/game (6th-most in the NBA) and 5.5 rebounds/game, leading the NBA in minutes (3,338) and finishing second in free throw percentage (.872) while earning All-NBA First Team honors. Eleven times during the season he played all 48 minutes. The following year, he averaged 4.3 rebounds/game, 6.8 assists/game (4th in the NBA) and 22.6 points/game (10th-most in the NBA). He also marked his highest field goal percentage (.421) and was named to the All-NBA Second Team. The 1961–62 season was his last one as star player; he averaged 19.0 pts/game and 5.8 assists/game (5th in the NBA).

In 1962, Shue was traded back to the New York Knicks for Darrall Imhoff and cash. In 1963, Shue was traded along with Paul Hogue to the Baltimore Bullets for Bill McGill.

Coaching and executive career 
As Shue moved on from playing, he would begin an NBA coaching career which would last over 22 years. He developed a reputation for helping bad teams become competitive. In 1986, the Los Angeles Times remarked, "Gene Shue has lost more games than any coach in NBA history, which is more of a testimony of Shue's coaching ability than a criticism. Anybody who can lose 768 games—he has won 757—and still be employed must be a good coach."

Baltimore Bullets 
Shue succeeded Buddy Jeannette as coach of the Baltimore Bullets on December 5, 1966. In his first coaching stint, the then 35-year-old led the Bullets and took over a 4-21 team mid-season leading them to a dismal 16–40 record in the 1966-67 season.  Two seasons later, he led the franchise to the best record in the league, also the franchise's first winning season. He oversaw the team's improvement with three 50-plus-win seasons and an Eastern Conference Championship in 1970–71. He guided the Bullets to the NBA Finals in 1971, but got swept by the Milwaukee Bucks led by Kareem Abdul-Jabbar and Oscar Robertson.

Shue's seven seasons in Baltimore were also noted for the Bullets' rivalry with the New York Knicks, in which both teams faced each other in the NBA playoffs for five straight years from 1969 to 1973. The Bullets lost to the Knicks four times in 1969 (0–4), 1970 (3–4), 1972 (2–4) and 1973 (1–4), winning only in 1971 (4–3).

Shue announced his resignation on June 8, 1973. He was not comfortable with the franchise's move to the Washington, D.C. suburbs beginning with the 1973–74 campaign. He explained, "Living and coaching in Baltimore was a beautiful situation. Now it is just not the same. They think I am Baltimore‐oriented and I am. They are looking for somebody to fit better into the Washington scene." He was replaced by K. C. Jones ten days later on June 18.

Philadelphia 76ers 
On June 15, 1973, a week after his departure from the Bullets, Shue signed a two‐year contract to succeed Kevin Loughery as head coach of the Philadelphia 76ers. He inherited a team whose 73 losses in the previous season is an NBA record. Under his leadership, the team increased their total from 25 games, then 34, then 46, and 50 with an Eastern Conference Championship. For the 76ers' 50-win 1976–77 season, Shue led a talented team with raised expectations, that Turquoise Erving (wife of Julius Erving) would lament in March 1977, "I feel we have the talent to win, but I don't think they're playing much like a team. No one here respects Shue. How many guys want to win one for Shue? Not one. And sometimes not even for themselves." Although reaching the Finals, they eventually lost to the Bill Walton–led Portland Trail Blazers in the NBA Finals, a devastating loss as Shue had spent much of the season dealing with in-fighting among the team's many stars. Shue was fired six games into the following season on November 4, 1977, having clashed with new owner Fitz Dixon despite raising the expectations to a championship. The team went as far as start a "We Owe You One" advertising campaign in reaction to the loss. Shue was succeeded by Billy Cunningham.

San Diego and Los Angeles Clippers 
The next season, Shue joined the newly relocated San Diego Clippers and surprised the league with a 43–39 record and a near-playoff berth. He was fired the next season after an 11-game losing streak.

Second stints 
Shue finally agreed to head coach the Washington Bullets when he signed a three-year contract to succeed Dick Motta on May 27, 1980. He would coach in Washington for six seasons.

His final head coaching assignment began on May 21, 1987, when he signed a three-year contract to return to the Clippers, which had relocated to Los Angeles three years earlier. He succeeded Don Chaney and inherited a Clippers team which had an NBA-worst 12–70 record in an injury-riddled 1986–87 and had failed to qualify for the playoffs for eleven consecutive seasons. With the Clippers beginning 1988–89 at 10–28 and in the midst of an eleven-game losing streak, Shue was fired on January 19, 1989, and assistant Don Casey was promoted to replace him. The Charlotte Hornets and Miami Heat, that season's expansion entries, both earned their first-ever victories at the expense of the Clippers which had the same win total as the former at the time of the coaching change. Shue's record in  years in Los Angeles was 27–93.

Shue finished his coaching career with a regular-season record of 784–861 while going 30–47 in the playoffs. His 784 wins are the 16th-most in NBA history and his 861 losses are the sixth-most in NBA history.  He won NBA Coach of the Year in 1968 and 1981, and was one of only eleven league coaches to win the award in multiple seasons at the time of his death.  He was the Eastern Conference Coach for two All-Star Games, in 1969 and 1977.

After his final coaching position, Shue opted to move to California to become vice president of a mortgage business and work for a bank, while also serving as an analyst for ESPN on Continental Basketball Association games. He would soon be chosen as the GM for the 76ers. He was infamously the target of Charles Barkley, who called Shue "a clown" as part of Barkley's effort to force a trade, and rumored tampering from executives from other teams.

Legacy

As a player 
Shue's dynamic guard play was influential for the newly formed NBA. He was known as a "gunner" who also played superb defense. His flair for dribbling and weaving was not the norm of the time, but would later become so for point guards. He had an ability to drive to the basket and use acrobatics to score or pass. His twisting layup wowed competitors, Elgin Baylor describing it as "tricky". He was one of the few players of his time to have a jump shot instead of a set shot (a habit from his grammar school's low ceiling), and to emphasize transitional offense. He invented the "spin move", the 360-degree spin with the ball switching hands.  An advocate for skill-based play, he once posited that "a basketball team composed of little men up to 6 feet 5 inches could beat a team of tall men 6 feet 5 inches and over."

As a coach 
Throughout his coaching career, Shue was known for his mix of fundamental basketball and unconventional strategies, many of which went against the norms of the time, but were sometimes adopted in future generations. His infamous playbooks were both celebrated for their innovation and maligned for their heftiness. In 1988, Gerald Henderson declared, "Gene Shue's teams always control the tempo." NBA.com stated that Shue was one of the only coaches that embraced set plays for the then-controversial three-point shots when the line was first introduced, stating that Shue "gave the shot the green light and red carpet." At times, he had his team's center bring up the ball. George McGinnis in describing the merits of Shue's coaching philosophy, said, "He has a lot of plays that use my individual talent and a lot of plays for the team." Earl Monroe noted Shue's ability to get star players, like Monroe himself, to adapt their flashy skills to sound, fundamental team play (noting the perceived racial segregation in styles of play of the time). Spencer Haywood described Shue's ability to instill confidence "My guy was Gene Shue, and still is Gene Shue, who had the faith in me to say, "Take this team, and let's go." Bill Walton wrote in his autobiography that Shue "was awesome, always so positive, upbeat, imaginative, and extremely creative."

In 1980, Sports Illustrated suggested that Shue "might be the reigning expert on the rehabilitation of players, judging from his penchant for taking in the league's rejects and wayward souls." In 2009, Fox Sports listed him as one of ten great players who became great coaches, noting that Shue "specialized in improving the fortunes of bad ball clubs, which is the only reason why he lost so many games."
Although his lifelong tendency to seek out challenging situations to turn around resulted in fewer wins, trophies, and accolades as both a player and a coach; in 1987, he remarked, "I think when you come into any losing situation, the first thing you have to bring with you is a positive attitude, one that your players can begin to believe in. Not that I ignore problems. I'm both optimistic and realistic. I have always been honest. I don't try to kid people." In 1989, the Los Angeles Times stated, "Gene Shue has proven to be one of the best coaches the NBA has ever had."

Post-career honors 
Shue was inducted into University of Maryland's Hall of Fame in 1991.  He was first on a ballot as a coach for the Naismith Basketball Hall of Fame in 1994, but was not elected.  He was nominated again the following year but again the bid was an unsuccessful one.  He was re-introduced in the Contributor category, where he was nominated, but not inducted, in 2011, 2012, and 2013.

Shue's basketball career included over 40 years in the NBA, although split as player, coach, and executive. Bleacher Report listed him first on their list of coaches not in the Hall of Fame (but factored in his playing career).

Personal life 
Shue married twice, both ending in divorce. His first wife was Dottie Shue, resulting in 3 children: Susan Shue, Linda Shue and Gregory Shue. After his divorce to Dottie, he was married to Sandy Shue. In 1985, when asked about the effect of basketball on home life, Sandy Shue remarked, "People think he's got the most violent temper. They say, 'He must be an absolute bear to live with.' When we first began dating I really didn't like it. If he lost a basketball game he wouldn't speak to anyone, even me. Now he pretends like things are okay, but he still stays awake all night."
  
He was the godfather of Danny Ferry (the son of Bob Ferry, whom Shue played alongside and coached), who would similarly become an NBA player and executive.

Shue was in a domestic partnership with Patti Amis Massey from 2009 until the time of his death.  They lived together in Marina Del Rey, California. Shue died on April 3, 2022, at his home in Marina Del Rey, aged 90. He had suffered from melanoma prior to his death.

NBA career statistics

Regular season

Playoffs

Head coaching record

|-
| align="left" |Baltimore
| align="left" |
|56||16||40|||||style="text-align:center;"|5th in Eastern ||—||—||—||—
|style="text-align:center;"|—
|-
| align="left" |Baltimore
| align="left" |
|82||36||46|||||style="text-align:center;"|6th in Eastern ||—||—||—||—
|style="text-align:center;"|—
|-
| align="left" |Baltimore
| align="left" |
|82||57||25|||||style="text-align:center;"|1st in Eastern ||4||0||4||
|style="text-align:center;"|Lost in Conf. Semifinals
|-
| align="left" |Baltimore
| align="left" |
|82||50||32|||||style="text-align:center;"|3rd in Eastern ||7||3||4||
|style="text-align:center;"|Lost in Conf. Semifinals
|-
| align="left" |Baltimore
| align="left" |
|82||42||40|||||style="text-align:center;"|1st in Central ||18||8||10||
|style="text-align:center;"|Lost in NBA Finals
|-
| align="left" |Baltimore
| align="left" |
|82||38||44|||||style="text-align:center;"|1st in Central ||6||2||4||
|style="text-align:center;"|Lost in Conf. Semifinals
|-
| align="left" |Baltimore
| align="left" |
|82||52||30||||style="text-align:center;"|1st in Central ||5||1||4||
|style="text-align:center;"|Lost in Conf. Semifinals
|-
| align="left" |Philadelphia
| align="left" |
|82||25||57|||||style="text-align:center;"|4th in Atlantic ||—||—||—||—
|style="text-align:center;"|—
|-
| align="left" |Philadelphia
| align="left" |
|82||34||48|||||style="text-align:center;"|4th in Atlantic ||—||—||—||—
|style="text-align:center;"|—
|-
| align="left" |Philadelphia
| align="left" |
|82||46||36|||||style="text-align:center;"|2nd in Atlantic ||3||1||2||
|style="text-align:center;"|Lost in First Round
|-
| align="left" |Philadelphia
| align="left" |
|82||50||32|||||style="text-align:center;"|1st in Atlantic ||19||10||9||
|style="text-align:center;"|Lost in NBA Finals
|-
| align="left" |Philadelphia
| align="left" |
|6||2||4|||||style="text-align:center;"|(fired) ||—||—||—||—
|style="text-align:center;"|—
|-
| align="left" |San Diego
| align="left" |
|82||43||39|||||style="text-align:center;"|5th in Pacific ||—||—||—||—
|style="text-align:center;"|—
|-
| align="left" |San Diego
| align="left" |
|82||35||47|||||style="text-align:center;"|5th in Pacific||—||—||—||—
|style="text-align:center;"|—
|-
| align="left" |Washington
| align="left" |
|82||39||43|||||style="text-align:center;"|4th in Atlantic ||—||—||—||—
|style="text-align:center;"|—
|-
| align="left" |Washington
| align="left" |
|82||43||39|||||style="text-align:center;"|4th in Atlantic ||7||3||4||
|style="text-align:center;"|Lost in Conf. Semifinals
|-
| align="left" |Washington
| align="left" |
|82||42||40|||||style="text-align:center;"|5th in Atlantic ||—||—||—||—
|style="text-align:center;"|—
|-
| align="left" |Washington
| align="left" |
|82||35||47|||||style="text-align:center;"|5th in Atlantic ||4||1||3||
|style="text-align:center;"|Lost in First Round
|-
| align="left" |Washington
| align="left" |
|82||40||42|||||style="text-align:center;"|4th in Atlantic ||4||1||3||
|style="text-align:center;"|Lost in First Round
|-
| align="left" |Washington
| align="left" |
|69||32||37|||||style="text-align:center;"|(fired)||—||—||—||—
|style="text-align:center;"|—
|-
| align="left" |Los Angeles
| align="left" |
|82||17||65|||||style="text-align:center;"|6th in Pacific ||—||—||—||—
|style="text-align:center;"|—
|-
| align="left" |Los Angeles
| align="left" |
|38||10||28|||||style="text-align:center;"|(fired) ||—||—||—||—
|style="text-align:center;"|—
|-
|-class="sortbottom"
| align="left" |Career
| ||1,645||784||861|||| ||77||30||47||||
|- class="sortbottom"
| colspan="12" style="text-align: center;"|Source:

References

External links
 BasketballReference.com: Gene Shue (as coach)
 BasketballReference.com: Gene Shue (as player)
 Video footage of Gene Shue as coach

1931 births
2022 deaths
American men's basketball coaches
American men's basketball players
Baltimore Bullets (1963–1973) head coaches
Baltimore Bullets (1963–1973) players
Basketball coaches from Maryland
Basketball players from Baltimore 
Deaths from melanoma 
Deaths from cancer in California
Detroit Pistons players
Fort Wayne Pistons players
Los Angeles Clippers head coaches
Maryland Terrapins men's basketball players
National Basketball Association All-Stars
New York Knicks players
Philadelphia 76ers head coaches
Philadelphia Warriors draft picks
Philadelphia Warriors players
Point guards
San Diego Clippers head coaches
Shooting guards
Sportspeople from Baltimore
Washington Bullets head coaches